Widgetsets support platform-sensitive development with the Lazarus IDE system. They act as adapter libraries that provide an interface between a platform-inpedentent sourcecode written in Free Pascal and platform-specific system functions. Thus they allow for development of platform-native software without requiring to provide specific source code for different target platforms.

Widgetsets act as basis for the Lazarus Component Library (LCL).

Available widgetsets 
Currently (June 2020), the development status of widget toolkit interfaces is roughly as follows:

References

Further reading 
 
 
 
 

Free Pascal
Pascal (programming language) libraries
Component-based software engineering
Platform-sensitive development
Widget toolkits